Michelle Smith is an Irish swimmer and 1996 Olympian.

Michelle or Michele Smith may also refer to:
Michele Smith (politician) (born 1955), member of the Chicago City Council
Michele Smith (softball) (born 1967), American softball player and 1996 and 2000 Olympian
Michele Smith (cyclist) (born 1970), Caymanian cyclist
Michelle Smith (fashion), American fashion designer
Michelle Ray Smith (born 1974), American soap opera actress
Michele Smith (actress), American TV host
Michelle Smith (sport shooter) (born 1983), English rifle shooter
Michelle Smith, co-author of the 1980 book Michelle Remembers